Kaia Wøien Nicolaisen (born 23 November 1990) is a Norwegian biathlete. She was born in Trondheim, but represents the club Asker SK. She has competed in the Biathlon World Cup, and represented Norway at the Biathlon World Championships 2016.

References

External links
 

1990 births
Living people
Sportspeople from Trondheim
People from Asker
Norwegian female biathletes
21st-century Norwegian women